Michael Arthur Hauck (born 5 March 1945), is a male former athlete who competed for England.

Athletics career
He represented England and won a bronze medal in the 4 x 400 metres relay, at the 1970 British Commonwealth Games in Edinburgh, Scotland.

References

1945 births
English male sprinters
Commonwealth Games medallists in athletics
Commonwealth Games bronze medallists for England
Athletes (track and field) at the 1970 British Commonwealth Games
Living people
Universiade medalists in athletics (track and field)
Universiade silver medalists for Great Britain
Universiade bronze medalists for Great Britain
20th-century English people
Medallists at the 1970 British Commonwealth Games